Yang Wenguang (died 1074) was a general in ancient China's Northern Song Dynasty.

In history, Yang Wenguang was the son of Yang Yanzhao, however, he is the grandson of Yang Yanzhao in the popular fictionalized stories of Yang clan warriors.

Biography
In 1044, Fan Zhongyan was dispatched to the Shaanxi area and met with Yang Wenguang. He was impressed and took Yang as his subordinate. In 1052, Yang Wenguang followed Di Qing in the expedition to Guangxi and helped defeat Nong Zhigao's rebellion. Afterwards he was promoted by Emperor Yingzong. Later, he built several forts in Shaanxi and successfully resisted several Western Xia invasion attempts. During Emperor Shenzong's reign, he was stationed in Dingzhou. He offered the emperor his strategy on recovering lost territories from the Khitans shortly before he died at the frontier.

In fiction
In fiction, Yang Wenguang is the son of Yang Zongbao and Mu Guiying.

References
  Toqto'a et al., History of Song, vol. 272 (Wenguang, grandson of Yang Ye)
  Mei Yi (梅毅), The Unknown Generals of the Yang Family (鮮為人知的楊家将), Nanchang: Jiangxi People's Press, 2011. 

1074 deaths
Song dynasty generals
The Generals of the Yang Family characters
Year of birth unknown